The 2016 United States presidential election in New Mexico was held on Tuesday, November 8, 2016, as part of the 2016 United States presidential election in which all 50 states plus the District of Columbia participated. New Mexico voters chose electors to represent them in the Electoral College via a popular vote, pitting the Republican Party's nominee, businessman Donald Trump, and running mate Indiana Governor Mike Pence against Democratic Party nominee, former Secretary of State Hillary Clinton, and her running mate Virginia Senator Tim Kaine. New Mexico has five electoral votes in the Electoral College.

Clinton won the state of New Mexico with a plurality, by a margin of 8.2 percentage points. The state had long been considered leaning Democratic, or a state Clinton would win, due to its large population of Hispanic/Latino and Native American voters. Former New Mexico Governor Gary Johnson achieved 9% in his home state, his best performance of any state and the Libertarian Party's best performance in any single state since Ed Clark received 11.66% of the vote in Alaska in 1980. Johnson's result was also the best result for a third party or independent candidate in New Mexico since Ross Perot's campaign in 1992. This is the third time since 1912, when New Mexico attained statehood, that the state voted for a candidate who did not win the Electoral College, the other instances being 1976 and 2000. However, in this election and in 2000, the state did vote for the winner of the popular vote.

Primary elections

Democratic primary

Four candidates appeared on the Democratic Party (United States) presidential primary ballot:
 Bernie Sanders
 Hillary Clinton
 Rocky De La Fuente
 Martin O'Malley (withdrawn)

Republican primary
Twelve candidates appeared on the Republican presidential primary ballot:
Jeb Bush (withdrawn)
Ben Carson (withdrawn)
Chris Christie (withdrawn)
Ted Cruz (withdrawn)
Carly Fiorina (withdrawn)
Jim Gilmore (withdrawn)
Mike Huckabee (withdrawn)
John Kasich (withdrawn)
Rand Paul (withdrawn)
Marco Rubio (withdrawn)
Rick Santorum (withdrawn)
Donald Trump

Donald Trump, the only candidate with an active campaign, won every delegate from New Mexico.

Polling

Albuquerque Journal October 2, 2016
 Clinton 35%
 Trump 31%
 Johnson 24%
 Stein 2%

Albuquerque Journal November 5, 2016
 Clinton 45%
 Trump 40%
 Johnson 11%
 Stein 3%

Clinton won every pre-election poll conducted. Her margin of victory varied from 2 points to 13 points. The last poll showed Clinton ahead of Trump 46% to 44%, while the average of the last three had Clinton leading Trump 45% to 40%, with many undecided voters who probably considered Gary Johnson, the state's former governor. Johnson even reached 24% in one poll conducted by the Albuquerque Journal.

General election

Predictions

Results

By county
Official results from New Mexico Secretary of State.

Counties that flipped from Democratic to Republican 

Colfax (largest city: Raton)
Hidalgo (largest city: Lordsburg)
Valencia (largest village: Los Lunas)

By congressional district 
Clinton won 2 of 3 congressional districts.

See also
 2016 Democratic Party presidential debates and forums
 2016 Democratic Party presidential primaries
 2016 Republican Party presidential debates and forums
 2016 Republican Party presidential primaries

References

NM
2016
United States presidential